The Shengsi Islands or Archipelago are part of the Zhoushan Archipelago and located south of the mouth of the Yangtze (east of Hangzhou Bay).

The islands are administered by Shengsi County of Zhoushan City. The area is also notable as tourist destination and a fishery that attracts more than 100,000 fishermen every winter.

See also
 Houtouwan – abandoned village on Shengshan Island, now a tourist attraction

References

External links

 Shanghai Star, 2001-04-26

Zhoushan
Tourist attractions in Zhejiang
Islands of the East China Sea
Archipelagoes of China
Archipelagoes of the Pacific Ocean
Shengsi Islands